Rolls-Royce SZ and Bentley SZ refers to several Rolls-Royce Motors and Bentley Motors Limited automobiles produced between  1980 and 2003.  

The SZ series succeeded the SY series, the basis for the Rolls-Royce Silver Shadow and Bentley T-series produced from 1965 to 1980.

The "SZ" was originally an internal code name at Rolls-Royce Motors. All SZ cars has the letter Z at the fourth position in the Vehicle Identification Number (VIN) and are powered by the Rolls-Royce – Bentley L Series V8 engine. The SZ was introduced to the media in Nice ahead of its official Geneva Motor Show debut.

Rolls-Royce SZ models 
 Rolls-Royce Silver Spirit
 Rolls-Royce Silver Spirit II
 Rolls-Royce Silver Spirit III
 Rolls-Royce New Silver Spirit (mark IV)
 Rolls-Royce Silver Spur
 Rolls-Royce Silver Spur II
 Rolls-Royce Silver Spur III
 Rolls-Royce New Silver Spur (mark IV)
 Rolls-Royce Silver Dawn
 Rolls-Royce Flying Spur
 Rolls-Royce Touring Limousine
 Rolls-Royce Park Ward Limousine
 Rolls-Royce Corniche (from 1982)
 Rolls-Royce Corniche II
 Rolls-Royce Corniche III
 Rolls-Royce Corniche IV
 Rolls-Royce Corniche V (2000)

Bentley SZ models 
 Bentley Mulsanne
 Bentley Mulsanne Turbo
 Bentley Eight
 Bentley Turbo R
 Bentley Turbo RT
 Bentley Mulsanne S
 Bentley Continental R
 Bentley Brooklands
 Bentley Azure (mark I)
 Bentley Continental T
 Bentley Touring Limousine
 Bentley Corniche (1982-1998)

Notes

Rolls-Royce
Bentley